Robert Johns Bulkley (October 8, 1880July 21, 1965) was an American attorney and politician from Ohio. A Democrat, he served in the United States House of Representatives, and in the United States Senate from 1930 until 1939.

Life and career
Bulkley was born to a wealthy family in Cleveland, Ohio in 1880. He attended the private University School before graduating from Harvard College  and law school. He commenced the practice of law in Cleveland, Ohio in 1906. Bulkley served two terms in the House from 1911-1915 from the 21st District on Cleveland's East Side. During World War I he served as chief of the legal section of the War Industries Board. He was later elected to the U.S. Senate in 1930 to fill the vacancy created by the death of Theodore E. Burton. Bulkley was re-elected in 1932, but lost a bid for a second full term in 1938 to Robert A. Taft. After his term in the Senate ended, he resumed his practice of law.

While a member of the House of Representatives, Bulkley became an expert on banking. He helped frame the Federal Reserve Act of 1913 and the Federal Farm Loan Act, which would not pass until 1916.

Bulkley knew Franklin D. Roosevelt from their college days when they worked together on the Harvard Crimson. student newspaper. Senator Bulkley praised President Roosevelt and most of the New Deal, and doled out a great deal of federal patronage. He was a moderate, midway between the liberals and the conservatives.  He voted against key New Deal laws such the National Industrial Recovery Act, Tennessee Valley Authority, Agricultural Adjustment Act, Works Progress Administration, soil conservation, and against the wages and hours legislation. Nevertheless, when Roosevelt was trying to purge the Democratic conservatives in 1938, he went to Ohio to praise and endorse Bulkley. The decisive factor for Roosevelt was that Bulkey had voted YEA on the two critical 1937 bills to for court-packing and for executive reorganization.

The Bulkley Building located in Playhouse Square in downtown Cleveland, Ohio is named after him.

Bulkley was married February 17, 1909 to Katherine Pope of Helena, Montana.

Electoral history

References

External links

1880 births
1965 deaths
Politicians from Cleveland
Democratic Party members of the United States House of Representatives from Ohio
Democratic Party United States senators from Ohio
20th-century American politicians
Harvard Law School alumni